Nebraska Highway 370 (N-370) is an east–west state highway in Nebraska that is  in length.  It begins at U.S. Route 6 and Nebraska Highway 31 in Gretna, Nebraska and ends at the U.S. Route 75 interchange in Bellevue, Nebraska.  It is the main east–west road in Sarpy County, Nebraska, which serves the southern Omaha suburbs.  It is known as the Strategic Air Command Memorial Highway.

Route description
Nebraska Highway 370 begins at US 6 and N-31 in Gretna, running east.  At Sapp Brothers Drive, N-370 becomes an expressway.  Shortly after that, it intersects Interstate 80.  One mile later, there is an interchange with Nebraska Highway 50, which is 144th Street.  About a mile later is Werner Park on the north, home of the Omaha Storm Chasers, the Kansas City Royals' Triple-A East affiliate in the former Pacific Coast League.  Highway 370 continues east as an expressway and meets Nebraska Highway 85, 84th Street/Washington Street, in Papillion.  It passes through the southern portion of Papillion and at about 48th Street, enters Bellevue.  After , it ends at U.S. Route 75, the Kennedy Expressway.  It then becomes Harlan Drive.

History
Prior to 2014, the highway continued east along the remainder of Harlan Drive, turned south at its intersection with Galvin Road, then turned east as Mission Avenue through Olde Towne Bellevue. It then connected with Iowa Highway 370 at the Bellevue Bridge. The Iowa highway was turned over to Mills County upon completion of the U.S. Route 34 bridge six miles southeast of Bellevue, and the Nebraska state-maintained length was shortened to its present terminus.

Major intersections

Points of interest
 Shadow Lake Towne Center in Papillion

References

External links

 The Nebraska Highways Page: Highways 301 and Above
 Nebraska Roads: NE 202-392

370
Transportation in Sarpy County, Nebraska